Monckton Hoffe (1880–1951) was an Irish playwright and screenwriter.

Early life 
On 26 December 1880, Hoffe was born in Connemara, Ireland. His full name was Reaney Monckton Hoffe-Miles.

Career 
Hoffe was known for his romantic comedies and was well known in commercial theatre in London in the 1920s. He wrote more than 20 plays.

He was initially an actor who wrote his first play, The Lady Who Dwelt in the Dark, in 1903. He became more widely known with The Little Damozel in 1909 in which Charles Hawtrey appeared. He wrote for films and broadcasting, and continued to act on stage and in films intermittently throughout his life.

Hoffe was married to Barbara Conrad but the marriage was dissolved in 1923.

He died on 4 November 1951 in London.

Selected plays
The Lady Who Dwelt in the Dark (1903)
The Little Damozel (1909)
The Faithful Heart (1921)
Pomp and Circumstance'' (1922)Hate ShipThe Flame of LoveThe Crooked Friday (1925)Many Waters  (1928)Grim Fairy Tale (1946)

Selected Screenplays
 The Little Damozel (1916)
 The Hate Ship (1929)
 Under the Greenwood Tree (1929)
 The Flame of Love (1930)
 Hai-Tang (1930)
 Bitter Sweet (1933)
 The Queen's Affair (1934)
 What Every Woman Knows (1934)The Bishop Misbehaves (1935)
 Pagliacci (1936)
 The Last of Mrs. Cheyney (1937)
 London Melody (1937)
 The Lady Eve (1941)

Honors and awards
Hoffe was nominated in 1941 for an Academy Award for Best Writing, Original Story for the Preston Sturges comedy The Lady Eve. The winner was Here Comes Mr. Jordan''.

References

External links

Plays by Monckton Hoffe and M. Hoffe on Great War Theatre

1880 births
1951 deaths
People from County Galway
Irish male dramatists and playwrights
Irish screenwriters
Irish male screenwriters
20th-century Irish dramatists and playwrights
20th-century male writers
20th-century screenwriters